Cosas del Amor is the third Spanish studio album recorded by Spanish singer-songwriter Enrique Iglesias, It was released by Fonovisa on 22 September 1998 (see 1998 in music). The album was produced again by Spanish songwriter and record producer Rafael Pérez-Botija, taking a more mature direction on the production of the album, departing from the pop rock ballads of his first two albums and focusing on latin pop arrangements similar to the likes of Luis Miguel.

Release and reception
In 1999, the album received a nomination for Best Latin Pop Performance at the 41st Annual Grammy Awards, losing to Vuelve by Ricky Martin. It yielded two number-one singles on the Billboard Hot Latin Tracks chart: "Esperanza" and "Nunca Te Olvidaré". The third single was canceled in favor of his first English language hit single "Bailamos". The album debuted at number-one in the Billboard Top Latin Albums chart in the week of 10 October 1998, staying at pole position for five weeks in 1998 and three weeks in 1999. In the Billboard 200, the album debuted and peaked at #64 with 21,500 copies sold, the highest debut by a latin language album since Luis Miguel's Romances. In its third week at the charts it sold 15,000. The album was certified Gold by Recording Industry Association of America in 1999.

Track listing

Charts

Weekly charts

Sales and certifications

See also
List of number-one Billboard Top Latin Albums from the 1990s
List of number-one Billboard Latin Pop Albums from the 1990s

References

1998 albums
Enrique Iglesias albums
Fonovisa Records albums
Spanish-language albums